Robert William Curtayne (29 March 1894 – 29 May 1970) was an  Australian rules footballer who played with St Kilda in the Victorian Football League (VFL).

Notes

External links 

1894 births
1970 deaths
Australian rules footballers from Victoria (Australia)
St Kilda Football Club players
Castlemaine Football Club players